Table tennis at the 2019 Military World Games was held in Wuhan, China from 19 to 26 October 2019.

Medal summary

Medalists

References

Military World Games
2019 in Chinese sport
Table Tennis
2019